Wind Telecom S.p.A. was a telecommunications holding company owned by the multinational telecommunications company VimpelCom. In 2011, it was merged into VimpelCom It was originally founded as Weather Investments S.p.A., a holding company controlled by Egyptian billionaire Naguib Sawiris.

Wind Telecom owns 100% of Wind Telecomunicazioni S.p.A. (“Wind”), the third largest mobile operator and second largest fixed line operator in Italy, with more than 19 million mobile subscribers and over 2.9 million direct fixed line subscribers as of November 2010. Wind Telecom also controls and owns 50% plus one share of Orascom Telecom Holding S.A.E. (“OTH”). OTH is a leading international telecommunications company operating Global System for Mobile Communications (GSM) networks in seven high growth markets in the Middle East, Africa and South Asia, having a total population under license of approximately 460 million with an average mobile telephony penetration of approximately 29% as at Match 31, 2007. OTH operates GSM network in Algeria, Bangladesh, Egypt, Iraq, Pakistan and Zimbabwe. OTH had over 56 million subscribers as of March 2007. OTH owns 19.3% of Hutchinson Telecommunication International, a leading telecommunication services provider operating in eight countries. OTH is traded on the Cairo and Alexandria stock exchange (ORTE.CA ORAT EY) and has GDRs traded on the London Stock Exchange (ORTEq.l, OTLD LI).

Wind Telecom S.p.A. is a leading international telecommunications company offering mobile, fixed, Internet and international communication services to about 100 million subscribers in Algeria, Bangladesh, Egypt, Italy, Pakistan and North Korea.

Wind Telecom subsidiary Global Telecom Holding formerly had an indirect equity ownership in Canadian mobile operator Wind Mobile which had been granted a spectrum license in Canada. The company is now independently owned by Canadian telecom company Shaw Communications under the name Freedom Mobile.

Wind Telecom operates through its subsidiaries Orascom Telecom Holding S.A.E. and Wind Telecomunicazioni S.p.A. (Italy). Wind Telecom is the entry point of choice for both technically advanced attractive markets and high growth, and under penetrated emerging markets.

History 
In June 2005, the company (named "Weather Investments S.p.A.") bought Wind Telecomunicazioni S.p.A., the third largest Italian mobile phone operator, The total value of the transaction was EUR 12.2 billion. The telecom operator offers its services under the brand name Wind.

Also in June 2005, 50% plus 1 share of Orascom Telecom Holding was transferred to Weather Investments.

In 2007 the company acquired the Greek mobile carrier TIM Hellas from Apax Partners and Texas Pacific Group (now TPG Capital) and rebranded it Wind Hellas in a deal worth EUR 3.4 billion (GBP 2.4 billion). Unfortunately, the Greek crisis brought the carrier in deep financial troubles, forcing Sawiris to sell the assets of the holding company (Weather Finance III) to a group of creditors, the SSN Ad-Hoc Committee. The transaction has been completed in December 2010. However the Wind brand is still used by the Greek carrier.

In early 2008 the company acquired the license to operate mobile services in North Korea under the name Koryolink making history by being the first mobile operator there.

In January 2011, the company decided to change its name, switching from "Weather Investments S.p.A." to "Wind Telecom S.p.A.", due to the intention to bring a new image to the group, focusing to the strong points as leading subject in telecommunications and capitalizing all the value and success achieved by the Wind brand in recent years, as declared by Khaled Bichara.

Also in January 2011, Global Telecom Holding completed its sale of Tunisian carrier Tunisiana to Qatar Telecom (QTel), in a deal worth $1.2 billion, leaving its previously owned 50 percent of Tunisiana through both Orascom Tunisia Holding and Carthage Consortium.

In March 2011, Wind Telecom officially became part of VimpelCom Ltd., the multinational wireless provider: its shareholders board definitely approved the prevented fusion between the Egyptian and the Russian company with 53.3% of participating votes, although Telenor, one of the main shareholders, opposed the deal. Consequently, the operation gave birth to the 6th largest telecommunication company worldwide, where Wind Telecom investors owned 20% of VimpelCom shares outstanding and about 31% of voting rights. Telenor stake has lowered to 31.7% from 39.6% and decrease its voting proportion to 25%. Altimo, the other main shareholder, had its stake diluted to 31.4% from 39.2%. Altimo voting rights has been reduced to 31%.

References

External links 
 

Telecommunications companies established in 2005
VEON